Aechmea retusa is a plant species in the genus Aechmea. This species is native to Ecuador, Colombia and Peru.

Cultivars
 Aechmea 'Brimstone'
 Aechmea 'Hellfire'
 Aechmea 'Hercules'
 Aechmea 'Laura Lynn'
 Aechmea 'Orange River'
 Aechmea 'Yapi'

References

retusa
Flora of South America
Plants described in 1964